Birce Atabey (born 26 January 1993) is a Turkish figure skater. She is a five-time Turkish national champion and the 2015 Sarajevo Open silver medalist.

Programs

Competitive highlights 
CS: Challenger Series; JGP: Junior Grand Prix

References

External links 

 

1993 births
Turkish female single skaters
Living people
People from Derince
Competitors at the 2015 Winter Universiade
Competitors at the 2013 Winter Universiade